Kukujevci is a village located in the municipality of Šid, Srem District, Vojvodina, Serbia. As of 2011 census, it has a population of 1,955 inhabitants.

Name
The name of the village in Serbian is plural.

History

Prior to the Yugoslav Wars, the population of the village was 89% Croat. During the Yugoslav Wars and particularly as a spillover from the Croatian War of Independence local Croat community in Kukujevci was exposed to harassment and persecution by Serbian nationalists leading to community's expulsion from the village. As a consequence of the war demographic structure of the village is today almost entirely different with 90% of population being ethnic Serbs, mostly Serb refugees who left after the collapse of the self-proclaimed SAO Western Slavonia or from other parts of Croatia. The new  Serbian population has sought to rename the village to Lazarevo.

See also
 List of places in Serbia
 List of cities, towns and villages in Vojvodina
 Kukujevci–Erdevik railway station

References

Populated places in Syrmia